Chilete District is one of eight districts of the province Contumazá in Peru.

References